Beauty Etsanyi Tukura (born 21 October 1997) is a reality TV star, entrepreneur and a beauty pageant contestant from Nigeria. In 2019, she won the 43rd Miss Nigeria 2019 competition.

Biography 
Beauty was born in the city of Port Harcourt, Nigeria, the youngest of four children.

In 2019, Tukura represented Taraba state at the Miss Nigeria pageant at Eko Convention Center, Lagos, and won the pageant. Tukura manages an online business known as StylishBeauty, which retails original branded items from various designers all around the world.

Beauty attended Nigerian Navy Secondary School, Ojo, Lagos, for her secondary education. Due to health challenges, she had to move away to continue her Senior Secondary School education at the American University of Nigeria Academy, Yola, Nigeria.,

Career 
Before making it as the 43rd Miss Nigeria, Beauty was a Lawyer and entrepreneur. She manages her online business known as StylishBeauty, where she retails original branded items from various designers across the globe.

Before joining the Big Brother house, she was a distributor for fashion brands across the globe.

Big Brother Naija Season 7 
At the start of this year’s Big Brother Naija, Beauty was unveiled as the second housemate to enter the Big Brother Naija Season Seven house. Two weeks later in the show she was disqualified after receiving three strikes from Big Brother for bending Big brother's rules and destruction of property.

References

Living people

1997 births